Ugep (also Umor) is a town in the Yakurr Local Government Area in Cross River State, southern Nigeria. The village is populated by the Yakurr people.

Ugep as it is popularly known is one of the unit that constitute Yakurr, its indigenes speak the Lokaa Language which is the general language spoken in Yakurr.

Ugep originated from a place or village called “Akpa” in the Eastern Ejagham race in the Central senatorial district of Cross River State, Nigeria.

The reason why the people of Ugep left Akpa was due to a religious clash between the two paternal families that makes up Akpa in the ritual rites performance in the death of a person from either of the tribe.

However, failure of the Ugep people to do the ritual performance for the deceased person is what led to “The Great Trek” where the people of Akpa pursued the people of Ugep out of the village, a man called Edem Omilakpa who was tired and weak with his pregnant wife, pushed a stone from the apex of a hill down to the Apka warriors and the stone killed all the warriors and landed at the feet of the King of Akpa that ends the war between Akpa and the people of Ugep, but the great trek continues. The stone is referred to as: “Ancient wonder and saviour stone ”

The people of Ugep did not just leave Akpa without any cultural heritage, they left with most of the cultures that were being practiced in Akpa, and that is the culture they practice till date. Ugep is administered and controlled by the Obol Lopon of Ugep who is the chief priest of Ojokobi (A fertility spirit) he is the central figure in the administrative system with powerful priest called Bi-Nah with their religious role like the Atewa Wu-kang - kang and Opebelede as the chief celebrant of the Ugep New yam festival.

Festival 
The New yam festival which is now one of the renown festivals in Cross  River  State  and was rebrand to international festival by the past Cross River State Governor Mr Donald Duke in 2005; Ebelembi, Obam; Ndebra; janenboku; Ledemboku. Etc.

Tourism 
The Leboku New Yam festival is celebrated in Ugep. Ugep is believed to be the largest village in Africa by land mass. Ugep is the headquarters of Yakurr Local Government Area in Cross River State, Nigeria. Fishing is also a common practice in the area

References

Populated places in Cross River State